"Carry On" is a song by American singer Martha Wash, released on October 30, 1992 through RCA Records as the lead single from her debut solo self-titled studio album, Martha Wash (1993). It was written by Eric Beall, who also composed the instrumentation in collaboration with Steve Skinner and peaked at number-one on the US Billboard Hot Dance Club Play chart.

Release
The single was the first release from her self-titled debut album, Martha Wash, which was part of her settlement deal with RCA Records after she sued the label over being uncredited for her work on previous songs by Black Box. The track was her first number-one single as a solo artist on the Billboard Hot Dance Club Play chart, reaching the top spot on December 5, 1992. In Europe, "Carry On" was a Top 40 hit in the Netherlands and a Top 50 hit in the UK.

Critical reception
Alex Henderson from AllMusic viewed the song as a "dance-floor gem", describing it as "soaring". Larry Flick from Billboard wrote, "After building a near-legendary reputation as a belter on hits by Black Box, C & C Music Factory, and the Weather Girls, it's difficult to believe that this is Wash's first solo recording. Regardless, she proves why she will always be the prototype for future dance music divas on this driven pop/dance romp. It almost doesn't even matter what she's singing; any chance to wonder at the power of her voice is worth taking. Fortunately, this song works just fine, and is roping in club DJs at a rapid rate. Watch radio to quickly follow suit." 

Caroline Sullivan from The Guardian said in her review of the Martha Wash album, "Things work best when her producer allows her gospel roots to emerge, as on the beautiful inspirational number "Carry On"." Connie Johnson from Los Angeles Times felt the "gospel-driven" song "ranks among the best tracks she has recorded." A reviewer from Music Week gave it three out of five, declaring the song as "uplifting", and concluding that Wash "deserves success in her own". Andy Beevers from the RM Dance Update rated it five out of five, naming it House Tune of the Week. He also complimented it as "a great, truly uplifting song". Gordon Chambers from Rolling Stone remarked that Wash "glides" on the track. Ian Hyland of Sunday Mirror gave it nine out of ten, writing, "Another one of those massive tunes that's been largin' it on the dance floor recently. Now you can have it at home."

Usage in media
In 2010, the song was used in the fifth episode of season two of reality competition television series RuPaul's Drag Race, in which Wash also served as guest judge. Contestants Sahara Davenport and Morgan McMichaels, were up for elimination and had to lipsync to the song in order to continue in the competition. During the episode, drag queen and head judge RuPaul emotionally recounted "That song is very special to me because when my mother passed away, that was the song that I would play all the time. I played Martha Wash's 'Carry On' non-stop. That's what got me through it."

Impact and legacy
British DJ, Phil Asher picked "Carry On" as one of his favourites in 1995, "My ex-girlfriend brought it back from New York. I'm still playing it to this day, in fact I played it last night. It's a vocal anthem of the real kind – no handbags in sight." In 1996, English house music DJ, DJ Paulette chose it as one of her favourites, saying, "I play this track towards the end of the night. The lyrics are perfect — she is the voice."

Track listings
 CD maxi, US
 "Carry On" (Original 7" Edit) — 3:30  
 "Carry On" (Album Radio Mix) — 4:17  
 "Carry On" (Masters At Work 7" Mix) — 4:10  
 "Carry On" (Masters At Work 12" Dance Mix) — 6:46  
 "Carry On" (Masters At Work Dub Mix) — 5:14  
 "Carry On" (Carried Away Dub) — 7:08  
 "Carry On" (Carry This 12" Dance Mix) — 5:26  
 "Carry On" (Vocal Bass Dub Mix) — 5:59  
 "Carry On" (12" Alternative Mix) — 7:26

Charts

Weekly charts

Year-end charts

See also
 List of number-one dance singles of 1992 (U.S.)

References

External links
Release information at Discogs
Official video at YouTube

1992 songs
1992 debut singles
American house music songs
House music songs
Martha Wash songs
RCA Records singles